This is a list of visitors to the Mir space station in alphabetical order. Station crew names are in bold. The suffix (twice) refers to the individual's number of Mir visits, not his or her total number of space flights. Entries without a flag symbol indicate that the person was a citizen from the bloc of countries comprising the former Soviet Union at launch.

Statistics 
Between 1986 and 2000, 104 individuals visited the Mir space station. Note that this list does not double count for individuals with dual citizenship (for example, the British-American astronaut Michael Foale is only listed under the United States).

By nationality

By agency

A

 Viktor Afanasyev (thrice)
 Thomas D. Akers  
 Toyohiro Akiyama  (tourist)
 Aleksandr Aleksandrov
 Aleksandr Aleksandrov 
 Michael P. Anderson  
 Jerome Apt  
 Anatoly Artsebarsky
 Toktar Aubakirov
 Sergei Avdeyev (thrice)

B
 Ellen S. Baker   
 Michael A. Baker  
 Aleksandr Balandin
 Yuri Baturin
 Ivan Bella 
 John E. Blaha  
 Michael J. Bloomfield  
 Nikolai Budarin (twice)

C
 Kenneth D. Cameron  
 Franklin R. Chang-Diaz  
 Kevin P. Chilton  
 Jean-Loup Chrétien  (twice) 
 Jean-François Clervoy  
 Michael R. Clifford  
 Eileen M. Collins

D
 Vladimir Dezhurov 
 Bonnie J. Dunbar   (twice)

E
 Joe F. Edwards  
 Reinhold Ewald 
 Léopold Eyharts

F
 Muhammed Faris 
 Klaus-Dietrich Flade 
 Michael Foale

G
 Robert L. Gibson  
 Yuri Gidzenko 
 Linda M. Godwin   
 John M. Grunsfeld

H
 Chris A. Hadfield  
 James D. Halsell  
 Claudie Haigneré  
 Jean-Pierre Haigneré (twice) 
 Gregory J. Harbaugh

I
 Marsha S. Ivins

J
 Brent W. Jett

K
 Aleksandr Kaleri (thrice)
 Janet L. Kavandi   
 Leonid Kizim 
 Yelena Kondakova  (twice) 
 Sergei Krikalev (twice)
 Valery Korzun

L
 Aleksandr Laveykin
 Wendy B. Lawrence   (twice) 
 Aleksandr Lazutkin
 Anatoli Levchenko 
 Jerry M. Linenger  
 Edward T. Lu  
 Shannon W. Lucid   
 Vladimir Lyakhov

M
 Yuri Malenchenko
 Gennadi Manakov (twice)
 Musa Manarov (twice)
 William S. McArthur  
 Ulf Merbold 
 Abdul Ahad Mohmand 
 Talgat Musabayev (twice)

N
 Carlos I. Noriega

O
 Yuri Onufrienko

P
 Gennady Padalka
 Scott E. Parazynski  
 Charles J. Precourt  (thrice) 
 Aleksandr Poleshchuk
 Valeri Polyakov (twice)
 Dominic L. Pudwill Gorie

R
 William F. Readdy  
 James F. Reilly  
 Thomas Reiter 
 Yuri Romanenko
 Jerry L. Ross  
 Valery Ryumin

S
 Viktor Savinykh
 Richard A. Searfoss  
 Ronald M. Sega  
 Aleksandr Serebrov (twice)
 Salizhan Sharipov 
 Helen Sharman  
 Anatoly Solovyev (five times) 
 Vladimir Solovyov
 Gennady Strekalov (twice)

T
 Norman E. Thagard  
 Andrew S.W. Thomas  
 Vladimir Titov (twice) 
 Michel Tognini 
 Vasili Tsibliyev (twice)

U
 Yury Usachev (twice)

V
 Franz Viehböck 
 Aleksandr Viktorenko (four times)
 Pavel Vinogradov
 Aleksandr Volkov (twice)

W
 Carl E. Walz  
 James D. Wetherbee  
 Terrence W. Wilcutt (twice)  
 Peter J.K. Wisoff  
 David A. Wolf

Z
 Sergei Zalyotin

See also
 List of astronauts by name

References

External links
NASA Shuttle-Mir overview
Mir Space Station

Astronauts by space program
Mir visitors

Mir visitors